Madame John's Legacy is a historic house museum at 632 Dumaine Street in the French Quarter of New Orleans, Louisiana.  Completed in 1788, it is one of the oldest houses in the French Quarter, and was built in the older French colonial style, rather than the more current Spanish colonial style of that time.  It was declared a National Historic Landmark in 1970 for its architectural significance.  The Louisiana State Museum owns the house and provides tours.

Description and history
Madame John's Legacy stands north of Jackson Square, on the southwest side of Dumaine Street between Royal and Chartres Streets.  The building's name derives from the story "Tite Poulette" by New Orleans author George Washington Cable, and refers to a building that previously stood on the site.  It is a French colonial raised cottage, its ground level a full-height basement built out of brick, and a wood frame main level above. The exterior is clad in wooden boards.  Behind the main building is an open courtyard, with a brick slave quarters, kitchen, and garconnière at the rear of the property probably dating to the 1820s.  The basement level of the house appears shorter than it was when built, in part because the street level has been raised in the intervening centuries.

Although archival records point to 1788 as the date of completion for its construction, archaeological investigations suggest that the house possibly incorporates a significant amount of an earlier one built on the site circa 1730 by François Marin and occupied by his widow, the New Orleans businesswoman Elisabeth Réal, until her death in 1777. Following the 1788 fire, owner Manuel de Lanzos instructed the American contractor Robert Jones to recycle as much brick and iron hardware as possible from his damaged house, suggesting that enough of it survived the fire to be included in the rebuilding. Whether entirely rebuilt in 1788 or a restoration of a damaged structure, the house managed to survive the 1794 fire unscathed. It underwent a number of alterations in the 19th century, most notably as part of a conversion to apartments in the late 19th century.  In 1947 the house was donated to the Louisiana State Museum and operated as a museum until 1965, when it was closed due to hurricane damage.  It was subjected to a painstaking restoration in the early 1970s, restoring it as much as possible to its late 18th-century appearance, and reopened.

This house is briefly seen in the 1994 movie Interview with the Vampire in a scene where caskets are being carried out of the house while Louis (Brad Pitt) is describing Lestat (Tom Cruise) and Claudia (Kirsten Dunst) going out on the town. Part of 12 Years a Slave was also filmed at the house.

See also

List of National Historic Landmarks in Louisiana
List of the oldest buildings in Louisiana
National Register of Historic Places listings in Orleans Parish, Louisiana

References

External links
Madame John's Legacy - Louisiana State Museum

National Historic Landmarks in Louisiana
French Quarter
Houses in New Orleans
Houses completed in 1788
Museums in New Orleans
Historic house museums in Louisiana
Louisiana State Museum
French colonial architecture
1788 establishments in New Spain
National Register of Historic Places in New Orleans
18th century in New Orleans
Slave cabins and quarters in the United States